The Turbot War (known in Spain as Guerra del Fletán) was an international fishing dispute and bloodless conflict between Canada and Spain and their respective supporters.

They arrested the trawler's crew, then forced the Estai to a Canadian harbour. Canada claimed that European Union factory ships were illegally overfishing Greenland halibut (also known as Greenland turbot) in the Northwest Atlantic Fisheries Organization (NAFO) regulated area on the Grand Banks of Newfoundland, just outside Canada's declared  exclusive economic zone (EEZ).

Background

Territorial seas have changed over time, having begun with a  "cannon shot" territorial sea, followed by the long-standing extension to a  standard. The economic control of the waters surrounding nations to  exclusive economic zones (EEZ) was agreed at the conference on the Third United Nations Convention on the Law of the Sea in 1982 and became recognized internationally on 14 November 1994.

As a self-governing colony and dominion, Newfoundland's foreign policy, just as Canada's, was established by the British government until the Statute of Westminster 1931. However, in 1934, the Newfoundland government voted to be put under the administration of a commission appointed by London, a situation that remained until 1949, when the Newfoundland entered Canadian Confederation.

After Confederation, Canada recognized many of the foreign policy agreements Newfoundland had entered into under the commission. From the 1950s to the 1970s, domestic and foreign fishing fleets became increasingly industrialized, with massive factory freezer trawlers fishing out of Newfoundland ports.

Many nations worldwide declared 200 nautical mile EEZs, including the United States. Canada did the same in 1977. The EEZ boundaries became a foreign policy issue when overlapping claims existed, as was the case between Canada and the United States in the Gulf of Maine, Dixon Entrance, Strait of Juan de Fuca and Beaufort Sea as well as between Canada and France in the case of St. Pierre and Miquelon.

Between 1973 and 1982, the United Nations and its member states negotiated the Third Convention of the Law of the Sea, one component of which was the concept of nations being allowed to declare an EEZ. Although not adopted into international law until 1982, the possibility of declaring an EEZ became a de facto reality in 1977 with the conclusion of those sections of the Third Conference negotiations relating to maritime boundary and economic control.

By the 1970s, the overfishing by industrial vessels in the waters of the other provinces of Eastern Canada was evident although each subsequent federal government continued to ignore the problem and even contributed to it by using the issuance of fishing licenses for more inshore and offshore domestic vessels.

After the Canadian declaration of its 200 nautical mile EEZ in 1977, fishermen on the whole in Eastern Canada could fish unhindered out to the limit without fear of competing with foreign fleets. The Canadian government provided subsidies to increase the domestic fishing fleet and the local industry. Meanwhile, the annual Total Allowable Catch (TAC) was set so high that fishing mortality was double that of the stock's Maximum Sustainable Yield (MSY).

During the late 1970s and the early 1980s, Canada's domestic offshore fleet grew as fishermen and fish processing companies rushed to take advantage. Canada's own fishery scientists assumed that only 5% of the Northern cod stocks was living in international waters regulated by NAFO, and 95% of the cod stock was living inside the Canadian EEZ, where only Canadian vessels were allowed to fish. By the late 1980s, smaller catches of Northern Cod were being reported along the Atlantic coast of Canada as the federal government and citizens of coastal regions in the area began to face the reality that domestic and foreign overfishing had taken its toll. In the end, stocks of cod in and around Canada's EEZ were severely depleted. Reluctant to act because of its already-declining political popularity, the federal government was finally forced to take drastic action in 1992, and a total moratorium was declared indefinitely for the Northern Cod. The TAC for both the Canadian EEZ and NAFO regulated area was based on Canadian scientific advice, which turned out to be wrong and the Northern cod stock collapsed in 1992 and has never recovered.

The immediate impact was felt most in Newfoundland, followed by the Atlantic coast of Nova Scotia. The nascent Northwest Atlantic Fisheries Organization, which was organised after the 1977 EEZ declarations to co-ordinate conservation efforts in Canada, the United States, and member nations in both Western and Eastern Europe also declared a ban, but it was implemented too late to be effective. Cod had five to ten years before been caught in record numbers, but it had vanished almost overnight to the point that it was considered for endangered species protection.

The economic impact in coastal Newfoundland was unprecedented. To lessen the impact that its policies of permitting overfishing had exacted upon rural Newfoundlanders, the federal government swiftly created a relief program called the "Atlantic Groundfish Strategy" (TAGS) to provide short- to medium-term financial support and employment retraining for the longer term.

Despite TAGS, Newfoundland and coastal Nova Scotian communities began to experience an out-migration on a scale not seen in Canada since prairie Dust Bowl of the 1930s. The anger at federal politicians was palpable. With the wholesale rejection of the new Prime Minister Kim Campbell, the incoming Prime Minister Jean Chrétien's Liberals were going to face the ongoing wrath of voters since their entire livelihoods had been decimated as a result of decades of federal neglect and mismanagement, and their communities, property values, net worth, and way of life were declining rapidly.

In the years since the cod moratorium, federal fisheries policy makers and scientists attempted to find a replacement species that could at least reinject economic stimulus into the affected regions. The ground fishery was a fraction of what it had been during the cod years but had some bright spots, one of which was the Greenland halibut, commonly known in Canada as turbot. Demand for the turbot had decreased because of a common dislike for its taste in the European Union.

Canada was not alone in recognising the growing value of the turbot, and foreign fishing fleets operating off the 200 nautical mile EEZ were also beginning to pursue the species in increasing numbers as a response to the Northern cod moratorium. However, the turbot was not a fish under quota regulation in NAFO until the autumn of 1994, when it established a catch limit. Until then, Spanish vessels had explored turbot fishery on the Nose and Tail of the Grand Banks.

The Canadians claimed that the turbot had relocated outside their EEZ to deeper waters, and they should have quotas based on their historical fisheries inside its EEZ. On the other hand, the Spanish and the Portuguese claimed that was an unexplored stock. Since they had initially started exploring the stocks, Spain and Portugal believed that they should have historic rights to the turbot fishery on the Grand Banks Nose and Tail, based on their historical catches. The total reported annual catches grew steadily from 27,000 t in 1990 to 62,000 t in 1994, when the Spanish and Portuguese vessels started to explore that fishery after other stocks were closed. Based on their catch history, the two countries claimed they should have 75% of the total turbot quota.

The turbot issue came before the NAFO annual meeting in Dartmouth, Nova Scotia, on 19 September through the 23rd, 1994. After questioning the scientists' advice, the EU proposed a TAC of 40,000 t although Canada argued for 15,000 t. The meeting ultimately settled on 27,000 t. Since agreement was not reached until the final day, a special meeting was scheduled for Brussels on 30 January through 1 February 1995 to establish a distribution key for allocating quotas among the contracting parties. The EU approved the overall catch limit at the December meeting of the Fisheries Council over the objections of Spain and Portugal, which argued that the EU should set an autonomous quota of 30,000 t on the basis that scientific evidence allowed for a 40,000 t TAC even though NAFO's Scientific Council had pointedly refrained from recommending a figure.

Canada and NAFO had tracked about 50 violations of boats crossing the 200 nautical mile EEZ limit to fish illegally within Canadian waters and recorded the use of illegal gear and overfishing outside Canadian waters. There was a growing concern in Canada that the turbot stock, like the Northern cod in 1992, was threatened by collapse.

In October 1994, the Minister of Fisheries and Oceans Brian Tobin, contacted the Spanish and Portuguese ambassadors and asked them to honour the NAFO regulation requiring countries to inspect their flag vessels to ensure that they were following the NAFO technical regulations. No improvement occurred.

In 1993, the NAFO council had already decided to introduce and test new inspection measures, such as on-board observers, on 10% of the vessels fishing in NAFO-regulated waters outside the Canadian EEZ and Vessel Monitoring System (VMS). The European Commission had tried to extend its jurisdiction and the power of its inspectors in 1993, but had been turned down by the European Union Council. However the EU Council could only try to persuade national governments to follow the internationally-agreed rules as well as the rules within EU waters.

Brian Tobin directed the Department of Fisheries and Oceans (DFO), along with the Department of Foreign Affairs and International Trade (DFAIT), to begin a very aggressive dialogue with the EU over the presence of its fishing fleet and its practices, particularly the use of illegal trawl nets just outside the Canadian EEZ while fishing for turbot. Tobin's critics in Canada noted that he was likely using his department as a political prop to shore up support during the increased social unrest in Maritime Canada, but in the winter of 1995, Tobin directed DFO to establish a legal argument that could be made for the seizure of a foreign vessel in international waters by using the premise of conservation.

At the December 1994 NAFO conference in Brussels, both the EU and Canada claimed 75% of the agreed 27,000 tonnes TAC for turbot in the NAFO-regulated area. Both parties cited their historical catches: Canada before 1992 and the EU after 1992. The Canadian position was that it objected to the use of historic catches. Instead, it argued the special interest of the coastal state in the Law of the Sea should be used for setting the national quotas.

On 1 March 1995, the EU Council ignored a last-minute plea from Canada and unanimously agreed to invoke the objection procedure under the NAFO agreement and to set a unilateral quota of 18,630t (69% of the TAC). Tobin tried to put the Law of the Sea's principles on coastal states' special interest to the test, as a first mover. Initially, Tobin had tried to persuade his Ministry of Foreign Affairs to make a unilateral extension of the Canadian EEZ to the entire Grand Banks, but that was rejected by the Canadian prime minister. Instead, Tobin declared that on 3 March 1995, the Coastal Fisheries Protection Act regulations had been broadened to make it an offence for Spanish and Portuguese vessels to fish for turbot on the Nose and Tail of the Grand Banks. On 6 March 1995, Tobin managed to have the Canadian cabinet authorize that extension of the law.

The same day, an EU reply came in a strongly-worded message from the Foreign Affairs Council that defended the EU's right to use the NAFO objection procedure, restated its commitment to conservation, and condemned the Coastal Fisheries Protection Act as a violation of international law.

Sections of the Canadian government agreed with the EU opinion on the unlawfulness of Canada arresting EU vessels outside the Canadian EEZ. There were strong opponents in the federal cabinet from the Ministry of Justice and the Ministry of Defence and the Royal Canadian Mounted Police (RCMP), which had different concerns over confronting the European Union over a fellow NATO member. Tobin managed to frame the issue and to gain the support of the prime minister. That settled the issue in the cabinet since it had been persuaded on the arrest of a Spanish vessel if diplomacy failed.

Estai incident
Tobin and the federal Cabinet told the DFO to demonstrate Canadian resolve on the issue by "making an example" of a European Union fishing vessel. On 9 March 1995, an offshore patrol aircraft detected the Spanish stern trawler Estai in international waters outside Canada's 200-nautical-mile EEZ. Armed DFO patrol vessels, Cape Roger, Leonard J. Cowley and Canadian Coast Guard ship , intercepted and pursued Estai, which cut its weighted trawl net and fled after an initial boarding attempt. A chase that lasted several hours ended after the Canadian Fisheries Patrol vessel Cape Roger fired a .50 calibre machine gun across the Estais bow. The Sir Wilfred Grenfell used high-pressure fire-fighting water cannon to deter other Spanish fishing vessels from disrupting the operation. Finally, armed DFO Fishery Officers and Royal Canadian Mounted Police (RCMP) officers boarded Estai in international waters on the Grand Banks.

Estai was escorted to St. John's, Newfoundland, and arrived with great fanfare across the region, the province, and the country. The Federal Court of Canada processed the case and the charges against the crew. Spain and the European Union protested vehemently, threatened boycotts against Canada, and wished to have the case heard at the International Court of Justice in The Hague, Netherlands.

On 11 March 1995, the Spanish Navy deployed the  Atalaya to protect its country's fishing vessels. The Spanish Navy also prepared a surface task group with frigates and tankers, but Spain eventually decided against sending it.

Tobin and his department ignored the controversy and instead had the oversized trawl net salvaged, which Estai had cut free. The DFO contracted a Fishery Products International ground fish trawler to drag for Estais trawl. On the first attempt, it retrieved the Estais net, which had been cut. It was found that Estai was using a liner with a mesh size that was smaller than permitted by the Northwest Atlantic Fisheries Organisation (NAFO). The net was shipped to New York City, where Tobin called an international press conference on board a rented barge in the East River outside the United Nations headquarters. There, the net from Estai was displayed, hanging from an enormous crane, and Tobin used the occasion to shame the Spanish and EU governments and pointed out the small size of the holes in the net which are illegal in Canada. Spain never denied that the net was from Estai but continued to protest Canada's use of "extraterritorial force." The Spanish government asked the International Court of Justice for leave to hear a case claiming that Canada had no right to detain Estai. However, the court later refused to hear the case. Later, Canada released the crew of Estai. On the same day that Tobin was in New York, the United Kingdom blocked a European Union proposal to impose sanctions on Canada. Tobin claimed that Canada would not enter into negotiations as long as illegal fishing continued and demanded the withdrawal of all fishing vessels in the area as a precondition. On 15 March, the owners of Estai posted a $500,000 bond for the vessel, and it was returned to Spain. Subsequently, the rest of the fishing fleet also left the area, and preliminary talks were scheduled for the upcoming G7 conference. These talks failed, as Spain refused to change its position, and Spanish fishing vessels subsequently returned to Grand Banks. Spain also implemented a visa mandate for all Canadians visiting or planning to visit the country. That resulted in several Canadians being deported from Spain who had been there legally when the visa mandate was adopted. The visa mandate was overturned by the EU in 1996. Negotiations ceased on 25 March, and the following day, Canadian ships cut the nets of the Portuguese trawler Pescamero Uno. The Spanish Navy responded by deploying a second patrol boat. Canadian warships and patrol planes in the vicinity were authorized by Canadian Prime Minister Jean Chrétien to fire on Spanish vessels that exposed their guns.

On 27 March 1995, EU Fisheries Commissioner Emma Bonino called the seizure "an act of organised piracy." Spain demanded for the Canadian government to return the ship to its captain and crew along with its catch of Greenland halibut, or turbot. It claimed that Estai had been fishing in international waters.

Direct negotiations between the EU and Canada eventually restarted, and a deal was reached on 5 April. Spain, however, rejected it and demanded better terms. After Canada threatened to remove Spanish fishing vessels by force, the EU pressured Spain into finally reaching a settlement on 15 April. Canada reimbursed the $500,000 that had been paid for Estais release, repealed the CFPR provision that allowed the arrest of Spanish vessels, and reduced Canada's own turbot allocation. A new international regime to observe EU and Canadian fishing vessels was also created and made a number of trial measures permanent, like on-board observers and VMS.

The dispute raised Tobin's political profile and helped to preserve his political career in Newfoundland at a time when federal politicians were being increasingly vilified. It also led to his decision in 1996 to pursue the leadership of the Liberal Party of Newfoundland after the resignation of Premier Clyde Wells, and he became a widely-discussed future possible leadership candidate for the Liberal Party of Canada.

International impact 
At the New York conference the Straddling Fish Stocks Agreement, which implemented the provisions of the United Nations Convention on the Law of the Sea of 10 December 1982 on the conservation and the management of straddling and highly-migratory fish stocks, was signed in December 1995. Tobin framed it as a result of the Canadian standoff with Europe, which found domestic support. The conference in fact repeatedly rejected proposals that would have conflicted with the Law of the Sea Convention, such as provisions that would have given coastal states fishery jurisdiction beyond 200 miles.

In the years to come, Canada underwent more hardship. On the other hand, Canadian fishing workers on Canada's East Coast applauded the conviction that Canada was acting as an environmental safeguard against over exploitation, but the jobs in the fishing industry had disappeared. The distant water fleets felt that Canada had destroyed the cod stocks and wanted everyone else to pay part of the cost.

The 2001 Helsinor meeting in Denmark was a turning point for NAFO and Canada. It marked the beginning of the end of Canada's coastal state dominance of NAFO, the decline of Canada's influence in protecting the fish stocks of the Northwest Atlantic, and the start of the EU's ascendance into the leadership position that Canada had filled for some 25 years. It began when Canada pushed a decision on depth limits for turbot fisheries to a vote and lost for the first time. That caused a lot of domestic concern in Canada, which basically required that the NAFO treaty should be changed.

In September 2005, the contracting parties agreed to begin the task of reforming NAFO with an EU-Canadian ad hoc working group, chaired by the EU as a result of growing pressure from Canada to reform NAFO. In 2006, the working group came out with its first draft proposals based on the North East Atlantic Fisheries Commission (NEAFC). The proposed treaty gave much more power to the distant water fleet states than the 1979 NAFO treaty. Some of the first drafts also gave NAFO the right to regulate fisheries within Canada's EEZ. The draft proposals also changed the voting procedures so that a two-thirds vote had to be present. However, it also changed the objection procedure that had made it possible for the EU to claim that Canada had broken international law when the EU objected to the turbot quota allocated to the EU in 1995, and Canada seized Estai. 

The new amendments were presented in September 2007 and went into force in May 2017, after two thirds of the contracting parties had ratified the agreement.

Newlyn incident
Although Spain was getting political support from the EU, including naval support from Germany among others, the United Kingdom and the Republic of Ireland supported Canada. British Prime Minister John Major risked his status within the EU community by speaking out against Spain.

That made some British fishing boats start flying Canadian flags to show their support. That brought the conflict to European waters when a Cornish fishing boat, Newlyn, flew the Canadian flag and was arrested by a French ship, which believed it to be Canadian.

That dragged the British and the Irish from their position of passive backing into full support of the Canadians. Overnight, Canadian flags began to fly from all manner of British and Irish vessels.

The rest of the EU rallied behind France and Spain but hesitated to make any mobilizations against the British, the Irish, or the Canadians.

Upon hearing the news of the conflict, Iceland spoke up and took the side of the EU against Britain in light of its similar conflict with the British back in the 1970s, known as the Cod Wars. No military mobilization took place, but Iceland put political pressure on the United Kingdom and Ireland. The British and the Irish ignored those actions and continued their support of Tobin and the other Canadians.

In the end, Newlyn was returned to the British without further incident.

See also
1993 Cherbourg incident
Cod Wars
Lobster War
Canada–Spain relations

References

Footnotes

Works cited

External links
Game Theory and the Turbot War
El día que Canadá y España vivieron su guerra del Fletán. La voz de Galicia 
For Cod and Country Spoof song based on Turbot War performed by Cultus Cod at Spring Scream 1995, Kenting, Taiwan.

Canada–Spain relations
Military history of Newfoundland and Labrador
Law of the sea
1995 in Canada
1995 in Spain
History of fishing
Battles and conflicts without fatalities
Maritime incidents in 1995
Conflicts in 1995
Maritime incidents in 1996
Fishing conflicts
Fisheries law
Fishing in Canada
International maritime incidents
1990s in Newfoundland and Labrador